The Société des Chemins de fer Katanga-Dilolo-Léopoldville (KDL) was a railway concession owner in the Congo Free State, Belgian Congo.
The network was built, maintained and operated by the Compagnie du chemin de fer du bas-Congo au Katanga (BCK).

History

In 1952 the Société des Chemins de fer Léopoldville-Katanga-Dilolo (LKD) merged with Compagnie de Chemin de fer du Katanga CFK to form the Société des Chemins de fer Katanga-Dilolo-Léopoldville (KDL).
The merger of the two companies was the work of Odon Jadot, chairman of the board of both CFK and KDL. 
The new company was the sole railway concessionary in the Katanga Province.
KDL held the rail network concessions in Katanga, while BCK was the operator.

In 1960 the company was nationalized and became the Compagnie des Chemins de Fer Kinshasa-Dilolo-Lubumbashi (KDL).
In 1970 the company took over BCK.
On 1 July 1974 the Compagnie de chemin de fer de Kinshasa-Dilolo-Lubumbashi was taken over by the state-owned Société Nationale des Chemins de Fer Zaïrois, which now owned all the railways in the Congo.

Network

 Dilolo - Tenke,
 Dilolo - Kasaji,, opened 1 June 1930 
 Kasaji - Manika, Kolwezi,, opened 10 March 1931
 Divuma – Kisenge mines,, opened in 1931, branch line

See also
 Rail transport in the Democratic Republic of the Congo

Citations

Sources

Railway companies of the Democratic Republic of the Congo
1952 establishments in the Belgian Congo
1974 disestablishments in Zaire
Railway companies of the Belgian Congo